Jernberg is a Swedish surname. Notable people with the surname include:

August Jernberg (1826–1896), Swedish artist
Michael Jernberg (born 1963), Swedish racing driver
Sixten Jernberg (1929–2012), Swedish cross-country skier
Sofia Jernberg (born 1983), Swedish opera singer

Swedish-language surnames